Escape from Undermountain is a fantasy novel by Mark Anthony, set in the world of the Forgotten Realms, and based on the Dungeons & Dragons role-playing game. It is the third novel published in the series "The Nobles". It was published in paperback, February 1996.

Plot summary
In Escape from Undermountain, a half-orc half-witch hero Artek Ar'talen the Knife, who has a 48-hour quest to rescue a nobleman from a subterranean labyrinth containing countless monsters. He has a small golden box from which a magical gate will appear to transport him and his ward out of Undermountain in their moment of need. For rescuing the nobleman, all crimes that the rogue has committed in the past will be pardoned. During the journey, he makes unlikely allies as they navigate the dangerous labyrinth made by mad wizard Halaster, trying to find a way out, before time runs out.

Reception
Jonathan Palmer reviewed Escape from Undermountain for Arcane magazine, rating it a 6 out of 10 overall. He says of the story, "This is real Dungeons & Dragons" and feels that "Something inevitably has to go wrong."  Palmer concludes the review by saying, "Mark Anthony writes to formula and what little plot there is he spells out early. That said, Escape is engaging and witty, so novices may find this Forgotten Realms novel a good introduction to the concepts of fantasy roleplaying."

References

1996 American novels
Forgotten Realms novels